Fort Henry is the name of:

Fort Henry, Missouri, an unincorporated community
Fort Henry (Virginia), a 1646 fort near present-day Petersburg, Virginia
Fort Henry (West Virginia), a 1774 fort near present–day Wheeling, West Virginia
Fort Henry, a winter camp built by Andrew Henry (fur trader) on Henry's Fork of the Snake River in 1810-11
Fort Henry National Historic Site (1837) in Kingston, Ontario, a limestone redoubt and connected fortified battery
Fort Henry (Jersey), an 18th-century fort on the island of Jersey
Fort Henry, Tennessee, site of the Battle of Fort Henry (1862) in Tennessee during the American Civil War
Fort Henry (bunker), a Second World War bunker in Studland Bay, Dorset
Fort Henry on the Missouri River, an 1822 fort southwest of present-day Williston, North Dakota

See also
 Battle of Fort Henry, in 1862 during the American Civil War, in Middle Tennessee
 Siege of Fort William Henry, in 1757 during the French and Indian War, on the frontier between the British Province of New York and the French Province of Canada
 Siege of Fort Henry (1777), during the American Revolutionary War, in Virginia
 Siege of Fort Henry (1782), in the same place in Virginia
 Fort McHenry, Maryland 
 , a gunboat which served in the Union Navy during the American Civil War